SVN Zweibrücken is a German association football club from the Niederauerbach quarter of Zweibrücken, Rhineland-Palatinate.

History
The association was founded in 1929 as SV Niederauerbach and remained an anonymous local side until winning its way to the Verbandsliga Südwest (V). A decade later the team captured the division title and was promoted to the Oberliga Südwest (V). SV also advanced to the finals of the Südwest Pokal (South West Cup) in that successful 2007–08 season, which earned the club a place in the DFB-Pokal (German Cup) tournament in 2008–09. In June 2009 the club changed its name to SVN Zweibrücken.

Since entering the Oberliga Südwest in 2008 the team has achieved good results, culminating in a second-place finish in 2011–12. From 2012-13 the Oberliga Südwest was renamed Oberliga Rheinland-Pfalz/Saar, with SVN Zweibrücken taking out the league title in its inaugural season and earning promotion to the Regionalliga Südwest. After a seventh-place finish in the league in 2014 the club came last in the following season and was relegated back to the Oberliga.

In December 2015 the club announced that it would not pay its players any more and had not done so since October. The club was in danger of becoming insolvent and had been lingering at the bottom of the table. In January 2016 the club withdrew its team from the Oberliga and restarted in one of the 10th-tier leagues below, the B-Klasse Pirmasens-Zweibrücken, for the following season by forming a joint team with FC Oberauerbach.

Honours
The club's honours:

League
 Oberliga Rheinland-Pfalz/Saar
 Champions: 2013
 Runners-up: 2012
 Verbandsliga Südwest (V) 
 Champions: 2008
 Runners-up: 2002

Cup
 South West Cup 
 Winners: 2011
 Runners-up: 2008, 2014

Recent seasons
The recent season-by-season performance of the club:

 With the introduction of the Regionalligas in 1994 and the 3. Liga in 2008 as the new third tier, below the 2. Bundesliga, all leagues below dropped one tier. In 2012 the Oberliga Südwest was renamed Oberliga Rheinland-Pfalz/Saar.

Key

References

External links 
 Official team site
 SVN Zweibrücken at Weltfussball.de
 Das deutsche Fußball-Archiv historical German domestic league tables 

Football clubs in Germany
Football clubs in Rhineland-Palatinate
Association football clubs established in 1929
1929 establishments in Germany